The 1960 Chico State Wildcats football team represented Chico State College—now known as California State University, Chico—as a member of the Far Western Conference (FWC) during the 1960 NCAA College Division football season. Led by third-year head coach George Maderos, Chico State compiled an overall record of 6–4 with a mark of 2–3 in conference play, placing in a three-way tie for third in the FWC. The team outscored its opponents 163 to 146 for the season. The Wildcats played home games at College Field in Chico, California.

Schedule

References

Chico State
Chico State Wildcats football seasons
Chico State Wildcats football